Christopher Kennedy Huebner (born 1969) is an associate professor of theology and philosophy at Canadian Mennonite University, as well as co-editor of Herald Press's Polyglossia series.

Huebner was born and raised in Winnipeg. He received a Bachelor of Theology degree from Canadian Mennonite Bible College in 1992, as well as Bachelor of Arts and Master of Arts degrees in philosophy from the University of Manitoba in 1992 and 1995 respectively. He received a Doctor of Philosophy degree in theology and ethics from Duke University in 2002 with the dissertation Unhandling History: Anti-Theory, Ethics, and the Practice of Witness. Prior to teaching at CMU, he was  an instructor  at Meredith College; and an instructor  at Duke University. Huebner's writing is primarily in the area of philosophical theology and can be located at the intersection of politics and epistemology, with a special interest in questions of peace and violence.

Selected bibliography

Books 
 The Wisdom of the Cross: Essays in Honor of John Howard Yoder. Co-edited with Hauerwas, Stanley; Huebner, Harry J.; Thiessen Nation, Mark. Grand Rapids, Michigan: Wm. B. Eerdmans Publishing Company. 1999. .
 
The New Yoder. Co-edited with Dula, Peter. Eugene, Oregon: Cascade Books. 2010. .

Theses

Book chapters 
 "History, Theory, and Anabaptism: A Conversation on Theology After John Howard Yoder". With Hauerwas, Stanley. In Hauerwas, Stanley; Huebner, Harry J.; Thiessen Nation, Mark. The Wisdom of the Cross: Essays in Honor of John Howard Yoder. Grand Rapids, Michigan: Wm. B. Eerdmans Publishing Company. 1999. .
 "The Work of Inheritance: Reflections on Receiving John Howard Yoder". In Bergen, Jeremy M.; Siegrist, Anthony G. Power and Practices: Engaging the Work of John Howard Yoder. Waterloo, Ontario: Herald Press. 2009. .
 "Marginality, Martyrdom, and the Messianic Remnant: Reflections on the Political Witness of St. Paul". In Reimer, Stephen R.; Gay, David. Locating the Past/Discovering the Present: Perspectives on Religion, Culture, and Marginality. Edmonton: University of Alberta Press. 2010. pp. 131–148.
 "The Work of Reading: Hauerwas, MacIntyre, and the Question of Liberalism". In Pinches, Charles R.; Johnson, Kelly S.; Collier, Charles M. Unsettling Arguments: A Festschrift on the Occasion of Stanley Hauerwas's 70th Birthday. Eugene, Oregon: Cascade Books. 2010. pp. 284–299.
 "Is a Christian University Strange Enough?" In Doerksen, Paul G.; Koop, Karl. The Church Made Strange for the Nations: Essays in Ecclesiology and Political Theology. Eugene, Oregon: Pickwick Publications. 2011. pp. 152–159.

Journal articles

References

External links 
Article by Chris Huebner from Direction
Article by Chris Huebner from Mennonite Life
Polyglossia Series launch

1969 births
Academics in Manitoba
Canadian Anabaptist theologians
Canadian ethicists
Canadian Mennonites
Canadian philosophers
Christian theology and politics
Duke University alumni
Living people
Mennonite theologians
Writers from Winnipeg
University of Manitoba alumni
Anabaptist philosophers
Mennonite writers